is the 6th single by the Japanese female idol group Momoiro Clover Z, released in Japan on November 23, 2011.

Release 
The single was released in three versions: the Limited Editions A and B and the Regular Edition. The limited editions came with a DVD featuring a music video, but contained only two different songs on the CD in comparison to three on the regular CD-only edition.

Songs and music videos

Title track 
The title track praises the nobility of labor. The lyrics repeat . The lyrics were written by Kenji Otsuki, the music and arrangement were by Ian Parton from the UK band The Go! Team.

The music video for the song features the five group members working in an office in so-called  and on a construction site in workwear. The "energy-saving suits" are half-sleeve tropical salaryman suits, worn with short-sleeved open-necked shirts. This kind of suit was heavily promoted by the Japanese government in the 1970s as a means to save energy on air conditioning at the time of the oil crisis.

B-sides 
The B-side "Santa-san" was produced by Kenichi Maeyamada, who had written for Momoiro Clover such trademark songs as "Ikuze! Kaitō Shōjo", "Coco Natsu", and "Z Densetsu: Owarinaki Kakumei".

The Regular Edition also features a third song titled "Bionic Cherry", which was a theme song for the movie Salvage Mice.

Promotion  
The promotional campaign for the single included a competition titled "Momoclo Painting Contest". The group announced that it needed a different promotional poster for each of 47 prefectures and invited people to submit their works.

The title track "Rodo Sanka" was premiered live on the rooftop of the From Chūbū building in Tachikawa, western Tokyo. The group wore "energy-saving suits". The concert was held on November 3 and included a total of 13 songs plus 3 for an encore.

Reception 
The CD single debuted in the 4th place of the Oricon Weekly Singles Chart. The limited edition B was the highest selling of the three in that first week of sales.  In 2012, fans voted "Santa-san" to number one on the Momoiro Clover Z Request Countdown, aired on Space Shower TV on August 31, 2012.

Track listing

Limited Editions A, B

Regular Edition

Chart performance

References

External links 
 CD single details on the official site

2011 singles
Momoiro Clover Z songs
King Records (Japan) singles
Japanese-language songs
2011 songs